The No-No's were an indie pop band based in Portland, Oregon.

The band formed in 1995 and released several albums and EPs into the early 2000s.

Members 

 Robin Bowser — vocals
 Mike Clark — guitar
 Ralf Youtz — bass
 Heather Dunn — drums
 Dan Heller — drums

Discography

Singles & EPs 
 New Species Anthem (Ross Records, 1997)
 Damage Done (Chromosome Records, 2000)

Albums 
 Secret Luminaries (Chromosome Records, 1999)
 Tinnitus (Animal World Recordings, 2000)
 Let Your Shadow Out (Chromosome Records, 2002)

References

Indie rock musical groups from Oregon
Musical groups from Portland, Oregon
Musical groups established in 1995
1995 establishments in Oregon